Cartoon Network is a Dutch television channel which primarily airs animated programming in the Netherlands and Belgium. This version is available in the Dutch and English languages. Some providers offer the Dutch language only.

History
On 17 September 1993, the pan-European feed of Cartoon Network launched, broadcasting in the Netherlands with English audio and sharing space with TNT Classic Movies.

The official Dutch feed would launch four years later on 12 July 1997. It broadcast for 18 hours a day, from 6AM until midnight. Most shows aired in English with Dutch subtitles, though some aired in Dutch as well. On 1 February 2000, a website for the channel was launched. A magazine launched on 13 April, with 11 issues and one special.

The Dutch feed closed down on 1 August 2001, and was replaced by the pan-European feed with a Dutch audio track, yet some shows still aired in English with subtitles and all continuity was in English. It aired 16 hours a day, from 6AM until 10PM. The channel's airtime was shortened on 1 April 2003, now broadcasting from 6AM until 9PM. A new logo was introduced on 21 April 2006. On 25 April 2008, UPC Nederland added an English audiotrack to the channel; Ziggo would do the same in 2010.

On 17 November 2010, the Dutch feed relaunched, broadcasting 24 hours a day and featuring the 2010 on-air style. All programs and ads air in Dutch. Some TV providers, like Belgacom and Canal Digitaal, kept broadcasting the Pan-European feed until 31 January 2011, marking the last day that feed aired in Dutch. All providers receive the Dutch feed since February 2011.

On 18 July 2018, Cartoon Network launched in HD on KPN, followed by Ziggo on 3 December.

References

Television channels in the Netherlands
Television channels and stations established in 1993
Dutch-language television networks
Turner Broadcasting System Europe
Cartoon Network
Turner Broadcasting System Netherlands